Community Unit School District 200 may refer to any of several school districts in Illinois:

 North Boone Community Unit School District 200 in Boone County
 Community Unit School District 200 (DuPage County, Illinois) — covering primarily Warrenville and Wheaton
 Woodstock Community Unit School District 200 in McHenry County
 Beecher Community Unit School District 200U in Will County